Mount Lena is a 5,995-foot-elevation (1,827 meter) mountain summit located in the Olympic Mountains, in Jefferson County of Washington state. It is situated within Olympic National Park, immediately north and 1,500 feet above the shore of Upper Lena Lake. Mt. Lena has a subsidiary peak, East Peak (5800+ ft/1768+ m), which lies northeast of the lake. Mount Bretherton lies across the lake to the south, Mount Stone is three miles to the southwest, and The Brothers approximately 3.5 miles to the northeast.  Precipitation runoff from the mountain drains north to the Duckabush River, and south into the Hamma Hamma River via Lena Creek. The non-technical ascent of Mount Lena involves hiking eight miles (one-way) and 5,300 feet elevation gain via the Upper Lena Lake Trail and cross-country above the lake, with most favorable conditions from July through September. There are pleasant campsites at the lake, and the ascent to the summit takes 1.5 hour from the lake. This mountain's name has been officially adopted by the United States Board on Geographic Names.

Climate
Mount Lena is located in the marine west coast climate zone of western North America. Most weather fronts originate in the Pacific Ocean, and travel northeast toward the Olympic Mountains. As fronts approach, they are forced upward by the peaks of the Olympic Range, causing them to drop their moisture in the form of rain or snowfall (Orographic lift). As a result, the Olympics experience high precipitation, especially during the winter months. During winter months, weather is usually cloudy, but, due to high pressure systems over the Pacific Ocean that intensify during summer months, there is often little or no cloud cover during the summer. Because of maritime influence, snow tends to be wet and heavy, resulting in avalanche danger. The months June through September offer the most favorable weather for visiting.

Geology

The Olympic Mountains are composed of obducted clastic wedge material and oceanic crust, primarily Eocene sandstone, turbidite, and basaltic oceanic crust. The mountains were sculpted during the Pleistocene era by erosion and glaciers advancing and retreating multiple times.

See also

 Geology of the Pacific Northwest
 Geography of Washington (state)

References

External links
 Weather forecast: Mount Lena

Lena
Lena
Lena
Lena
Lena
Lena